Playing with Fire is a 1934 German comedy film directed by Ralph Arthur Roberts and starring Paul Hörbiger, Trude Marlen and Elga Brink.

The film's sets were designed by the art director Erich Kettelhut and Max Mellin.

Cast
 Paul Hörbiger as Dr. Alfred Kramer
 Trude Marlen as Annette - seine Frau
 Elga Brink as Sylvia Bernhardt - Sängerin
 Willi Schaeffers as Gründlich, Schriftsteller
 Horst Birr as Emil Kummerberg, Kellner
 Ellen Hille as Marie, Mädchen bei Kramer
 Hilde Krüger as Helene, Zofe bei Sylvia
 Aribert Wäscher as Whitemann, Manager
 Ernst Hofmann
 Josef Reithofer
 Ernst G. Schiffner
 Hans Sternberg
 Toni Tetzlaff
 Boris Walt

References

Bibliography

External links 
 

1934 films
Films of Nazi Germany
German comedy films
1934 comedy films
1930s German-language films
UFA GmbH films
German black-and-white films
1930s German films